Lee Hyun-Chang (born 2 November 1985) is a South Korean football midfielder who currently plays for Chungju Hummel in the K League Challenge.

Club career 
Lee joined Daegu FC from Yeungnam University in time to feature in the 2009 K-League season.  One of the more successful players of the 2009 intake, Lee played in the majority of the 2009 season matches, scoring one goal in the league, plus another in the FA Cup (against Suwon City FC).

Career statistics

External links 

1985 births
Living people
Association football midfielders
South Korean footballers
Daegu FC players
Gangneung City FC players
Goyang Zaicro FC players
Chungju Hummel FC players
K League 1 players
Korea National League players
K League 2 players
Yeungnam University alumni